Phytoecia cincticollis is a species of beetle in the family Cerambycidae. It was described by Per Olof Christopher Aurivillius in 1925. It is known from Kenya.

References

Phytoecia
Beetles described in 1925